, real name Akiyo Masuda (増田明代 Masuda Akiyo) (born Akiyo Hashimoto (橋本明代 Hashimoto Akiyo) on August 29, 1950), is a Japanese enka singer and painter. Her stage name "Yashiro" is adopted from her hometown, "Yatsushiro" (八代).

History
Yashiro originally sang jazz standards in hostess clubs, but made her debut as an enka singer in 1971, with the single "Ai wa Shindemo (愛は死んでも)", under the label of Teichiku Records. Seeing the single's lack of success, she appeared on the YTV's Zen Nihon Kayō Senshuken (全日本歌謡選手権) audition, winning it for 10 consecutive weeks. In 1973, her single and album "Namida Koi" (なみだ恋) sold up to 1.2 million copies. Since then, her songs like "Shinobigoi" (しのび恋), "Ai Hitosuji" (愛ひとすじ), "Onna no Yume" (おんなの夢), "Mō Ichidō Aitai" (もう一度逢いたい), "Onna Minatomachi" (おんな港町), and "Ai no Shūchakueki" (愛の終着駅) also became great hits at the time, in which the songs portrayed a woman's emotion. In 1979, her single "Funauta" (舟唄) also made a great hit, followed by "Ame no Bojō (雨の慕情)" in 1980. "Ame no Bojō" won the 22nd Japan Record Award of the year. She continued collaborating with Teichiku until 1981, before turning to Century Records, where she released singles like "Umineko" (海猫), "Nihonkai" (日本海), and "Koisegawa" (恋瀬川), until 1986. Currently, she is recording under the Nippon Columbia label since 1986.

Yashiro was the first female enka singer to have seven top 10 singles on the main Oricon chart, as well as being listed as the fourth enka singer behind male singers Kiyoshi Hikawa, Hiroshi Itsuki and Shinichi Mori. She also achieved top 10 on the Oricon album charts for three consecutive years (1974–1976).

Appearances at Kōhaku Uta Gassen

Yashiro has performed 23 times in the Kōhaku Uta Gassen. She performed consecutively for 15 years (1973–1987), but was not invited to perform in 1988. She was qualified again in 1989. Thereafter, she performed for the next consecutive 5 years (until 1993) and lost the qualification again in 1994, and return to participate again for 3 consecutive years since 1999. She last performed in the prestigious annual show in 2001. She was invited but declined to perform in 2005 with the popularity poll "Sukiuta" (スキウタ).

She has 3 singles which have been sung more than once, which are "Namida Koi" (2 times (in 1973 & 2000)), "Mō Ichidō Aitai" (2 times (1976 & 1993)), and "Funauta" (3 times (1979, 1991, and 1999)).

Discography

Collaborations 
 Unagitani (鰻谷) - Eigo Kawashima
 Sayonara Anta (さよならあんた) - Eigo Kawashima
 Tsuki no Hanamatsuri (月の花まつり) - Eigo Kawashima

References

External links
Official website 
Wikipedia Japan Article 

1950 births
Enka singers
Japanese painters
Living people
People from Yatsushiro, Kumamoto
Japanese women jazz singers
Musicians from Kumamoto Prefecture
20th-century Japanese women singers
20th-century Japanese singers
21st-century Japanese women singers
21st-century Japanese singers